Holm Sigvald Morgenlien (1 March 1909 – 18 May 1995) was a Norwegian politician for the Labour Party.

He was a deputy representative to the Parliament of Norway from the constituency Akershus during the term 1950–1953. In total he met during 84 days of parliamentary session.

References

1909 births
1995 deaths
Akershus politicians
Deputy members of the Storting
Labour Party (Norway) politicians